Mansfield Municipal Airport  is a public airport located  southeast of the central business district of Mansfield, a town in Bristol County, Massachusetts, United States. During World War II, the airfield was Naval Outlying Landing Field Mansfield.

The airport offers flight training, fuel, etc.

Facilities
Runway 14/32: , Surface: Asphalt
Runway 4/22: , Surface: Turf

Accidents and incidents
On 26 July 1981, a Piper Colt crashed shortly after takeoff; the pilot and passenger were uninjured.
On 28 January 1984, a Piper Arrow that departed Mansfield disappeared. Its wreckage was located near Gardner Municipal Airport on 10 February 1984; none of the four occupants survived.
On 8 September 2007, A Cessna 172 crashed on takeoff, killing two of the four occupants.
On 15 February 2014, a Cessna 172 practicing landings hit a snowbank and skidded off the runway; the pilot was uninjured.
On 23 February 2019, a flight instructor and student were killed when their Cessna 172 crashed at Mansfield; they had departed Norwood Memorial Airport an hour earlier.

References

Airport Master Record (FAA Form 5010), also available as a printable form (PDF)

External links
Airport Commission at mansfieldma.com

Airports in Bristol County, Massachusetts